The augmented seventh chord, or seventh augmented fifth chord, or seventh sharp five chord is a seventh chord composed of a root, major third, augmented fifth, and minor seventh (1, 3, 5, 7). It can be viewed as an augmented triad with a minor seventh. When using popular-music symbols, it is denoted by +7, aug7, or 75. For example, the augmented seventh chord built on C, written as C+7, has pitches C–E–G–B:

 

The chord can be represented by the integer notation {0, 4, 8, 10}.

Use 
The root is the only optional note in an augmented seventh chord, the fifth being required because it is raised. This alteration is useful in the major mode because the raised 5th creates a leading tone to the 3rd of the tonic triad. See also dominant.

In rock parlance, the term augmented seventh chord is sometimes confusingly and erroneously used to refer to the so-called "Hendrix chord", a 79 chord which contains the interval of an augmented ninth but not an augmented fifth.
The augmented minor seventh chord may be considered an altered dominant seventh and may use the whole tone scale, as may the dominant seventh flat five chord. See chord-scale system.

The augmented seventh chord normally resolves to the chord a perfect fifth below. Thus, G aug7 resolves to a C major or minor chord, for example.

Augmented seventh chord table
{| class="wikitable"
!Chord
!Root
!Major third
!Augmented fifth
!Minor seventh
|-
!Caug7
|C
|E
|G
|B
|-
!Caug7
|C
|E (F)
|G (A)
|B
|-
!Daug7
|D
|F
|A
|C (B)
|-
!Daug7
|D
|F
|A
|C
|-
!Daug7
|D
|F (G)
|A (B)
|C
|-
!Eaug7
|E
|G
|B
|D
|-
!Eaug7
|E
|G
|B (C)
|D
|-
!Faug7
|F
|A
|C
|E
|-
!Faug7
|F
|A
|C (D)
|E
|-
!Gaug7
|G
|B
|D
|F (E)
|-
!Gaug7
|G
|B
|D
|F
|-
!Gaug7
|G
|B (C)
|D (E)
|F
|-
!Aaug7
|A
|C
|E
|G
|-
!Aaug7
|A
|C
|E (F)
|G
|-
!Aaug7
|A
|C (D)
|E (F)
|G
|-
!Baug7
|B
|D
|F
|A
|-
!Baug7
|B
|D
|F (G)
|A
|}

See also
Augmentation (music)

References

Seventh chords